This article is a list of diseases of papaya (Carica papaya).

Bacterial diseases

Fungal diseases

Miscellaneous diseases and disorders

Nematodes, parasitic

Phytoplasmal diseases

Viral and viroid diseases

References

 Common Names of Diseases, The American Phytopathological Society

Papaya
 List